Command: Modern Air Naval Operations is a warfare simulation video game developed by Greek studio Warfare Sims, published by Matrix Games and released on September 24, 2013. Often described as the spiritual successor to the legacy Harpoon series, Command expanded on both the scope and detail of simulation compared to Harpoon and was designed to overcome the earlier series' limitations.

Gameplay
In command: Modern Air Naval Operations, players have operational control over units on a 2D map of the Earth. Similar to Harpoon, players can command their units using pre-set missions or by giving direct instructions of the "Go here, do this" variety. The size and scale of the engagements depend only on the scenario; the engine can perform small patrol boat battles right up to global warfare, with hardware performance being the only relevant limitation to scale. Individual scenarios vary from a few hours to multiple days of real-time, although time can be accelerated to allow faster completion of operations. No multiplayer mode is currently included with the commercial license for any game in the series. Both games also feature a scenario editor that allows for real-time changes to scenarios under construction, allowing battles in the editor to be run and changed instantly. Copies purchased from the Steam platform allow users to share such user-made scenarios through the Workshop.

Development
The Warfare Sims development team released a number of updates containing new simulation mechanics, improvements and bugfixes based on player feedback.

Upon release of its sequel, Command: Modern Operations, on November 14, 2019, Command: Modern Air Naval Operations was taken down from the Steam Store and the Matrix Games website, although those who had previously purchased the game on Steam did not have it removed from their library.

Downloadable content
New scenarios are available for purchase in the form of downloadable content. One such scenario, Northern Inferno, released 22 October 2015, depicts a World War III between NATO and the Warsaw Pact in 1975. It has 15 levels, whereas another one, Command Live, is a series of one-level scenario downloadable content packs that deal with contemporary events.

Professional Edition

An official "professional edition" was unveiled in May 2015, offering advanced functionality tailored to the needs of defence-related professionals and organizations.  Features exclusive to the Professional license include: full database-editing access, umpire-controlled WEGO-style multiplayer, Monte-Carlo mode (statistical analysis), data import/export and more. (these additional abilities are offered piecemeal to allow customers to tailor Command to their needs.) One of the first unveiled professional customers has been BAE Systems.

Reception
SimHQ gave the game a rating of 9.5/10. Rock Paper Shotgun contributor Tim Stone criticized the game for feeling incomplete compared to its competitors, specifically remarking on its lacking audio presentation, lack of multiplayer, as well as its high launch price.

Command: Modern Air Naval Operations was picked as the "Top Simulation of 2013" by Eurogamer of Denmark.

Sequel 

Command: Modern Operations is a sequel released on November 14, 2019. While the core gameplay and mechanics are largely similar to its predecessor (maintaining backward compatibility with Command: Modern Air Naval Operations scenarios), Command: Modern Operations runs on a newer version of its 32-bit engine. Among the main features that differentiate it from Command: Modern Air Naval Operations are: Tacview integration (allows for a live 3D view of a scenario, although scenario recording and playback is not supported for Command: Modern Operations at this time); a quick-battle generator; detailed satellite maps of the entire planet; and automatic image fetching for a number of common entries in the databases (an internet connection is required for the on-the-fly image download of both); a new UI; realistic submarine communication; and terrain effects on ground operations and weapon deployment. Also included are the latest versions of the DB3000 and Cold war databases that Command: Modern Air Naval Operations and the prior Harpoon games utilized. (These determine the number, properties and capabilities of all the weapon systems and units in the game.)

See also 
 Naval War: Arctic Circle
 Jane's Fleet Command
 Dangerous Waters

References

External links 
 

2013 video games
2019 video games
Cold War video games
Computer wargames
Lua (programming language)-scripted video games
Naval video games
Ship simulation games
Video games developed in Greece
Windows games
Windows-only games
Strategy First games
Submarine simulation video games
Tactical wargames
Matrix Games games
Single-player video games